Stephen Ormsby (1759March 4, 1844) was a U.S. Representative from Kentucky.

He was born in County Sligo, Ireland, immigrated to the United States when a boy, and settled in Philadelphia, Pennsylvania. He pursued classical studies and studied law.

Ormsby was admitted to the bar in 1786 and commenced the practice of his profession in Danville, Kentucky. He became Deputy Attorney General of Jefferson County, Kentucky in 1787.
Ormsby served in the early Indian wars, and as a brigadier general under Gen. Josiah Harmar in the campaign of 1790. He served as judge of the district court of Jefferson County in 1791, as a presidential elector in 1796, and as a judge of the circuit court 1802-1810.

Ormsby was elected as a Democratic-Republican to the Twelfth Congress (March 4, 1811 – March 3, 1813). He was an unsuccessful candidate for reelection to the Thirteenth Congress.

Ormsby was elected to the Thirteenth Congress to fill the vacancy caused by the death of Representative-elect John Simpson. He was then re-elected to the Fourteenth Congress and served from April 20, 1813, to March 3, 1817, but was an unsuccessful candidate for reelection to the Fifteenth Congress.

He was appointed first president of the branch of the Bank of the United States of Louisville, Kentucky, in 1817.

Stephen Ormsby died near Louisville, Kentucky on March 4, 1844.  He was interred in the Ormsby Burial Ground (later the property of the Kentucky Military Institute) at Lyndon, near Louisville, Kentucky.

References

1759 births
1844 deaths
Politicians from County Sligo
Politicians from Louisville, Kentucky
American militia generals
Democratic-Republican Party members of the United States House of Representatives from Kentucky
Kentucky state court judges
Kentucky lawyers
American bank presidents
Irish emigrants to the United States (before 1923)
Burials in Kentucky
1796 United States presidential electors
18th-century American lawyers
18th-century American judges
19th-century American lawyers
18th-century American politicians
19th-century American politicians